Margie Cole is an American North American champion bridge player. She won the Smith  Life Master Women's Pairs in March 2022 playing with Migry Zur Campanile. She won the next North American Women's Pairs event, at the next North American Bridge Championship, the Wagar Women's Pairs in July 2022 playing with Sandra Rimstedt.

Bridge accomplishments

Wins
 North American Bridge Championships (2)
 Smith Life Master Women's Pairs (1) 2022 
 Wagar Women's Pairs (1) 2022

Runners-up
 North American Bridge Championships (1)
 Mitchell Board-a-Match Teams (1) 2019

Personal life
Margie is married with two children.

References

American contract bridge players
Living people
Year of birth missing (living people)